Songs of Faith may refer to:

 Songs of Faith (Aretha Franklin album), 1956
 Songs of Faith (Jack Hannah album)
 Songs of Faith (Jo Stafford album), 1950

See also
Songs of Faith and Devotion
Songs of Faith and Devotion Live